The Virú Province is one of twelve provinces of the La Libertad Region in Peru. The capital of the province is Virú.

Political division
The province is divided into three districts, which are:
 Chao
 Guadalupito
 Virú

References

External links
  Municipal website

Provinces of the La Libertad Region